Oliveonia is a genus of fungi in the order  Auriculariales. Species form thin, effused, corticioid basidiocarps (fruit bodies) with microscopically prominent cystidia and aseptate basidia producing basidiospores that give rise to secondary spores. All species are believed to be saprotrophic, most growing on dead wood. The genus was originally published by American mycologist L.S. Olive in 1957 as Heteromyces, but this is an illegitimate later homonym of the lichen genus Heteromyces Müll.Arg. (1889). The genus was renamed Oliveonia by Dutch mycologist M.A. Donk in 1958.

References

Auriculariales
Basidiomycota genera
Taxa described in 1958